This is a list of major waterfalls in Estonia.

References

Further reading
Avo Miidel: "Mitu juga on Eestis?" Eesti Loodus, 1997, nr 5, lk 210–212.
Kalle Suuroja. Eesti joad, Tallinn 2003.

Waterfalls
 
Estonia